Henry Michael Tingelhoff (May 22, 1940 – September 11, 2021) was an American professional football player who was a center for the Minnesota Vikings of the National Football League (NFL) from 1962 to 1978. He was elected to the Pro Football Hall of Fame in 2015, his 32nd year of eligibility.

College career
Tingelhoff attended the University of Nebraska–Lincoln. He earned three letters during his football career there, but did not become a starter until his senior season in 1961. He was a co-captain of that 1961 team, which had its biggest offensive output in over five seasons. Tingelhoff participated in the Senior Bowl in Mobile, Alabama, and in the All-American Bowl after the regular season was over.

Professional career
After graduating from Nebraska, Tingelhoff entered the 1962 NFL Draft but was not drafted and instead signed with the Minnesota Vikings as a free agent in 1962. He became their starting center during his rookie season and held that spot until he retired in 1978. He was an AP First-team All-Pro selection for the first of five times in 1964 and also began a streak of six straight Pro Bowl appearances (1964–1969) that season. In 1967, he was named First-team All-Pro by Newspaper Enterprise Association and UPI and Second-team All-Pro by the AP. In 1969, he was named the NFL's Top Offensive Lineman of the Year by the 1,000-Yard Club in Columbus, Ohio. In 1970, he was named First-team All-Pro by both the PFWA and Pro Football Weekly.  He was also named Second-team All-Pro by Newspaper Enterprise Association.  He was named First-team All-NFC for that season by the AP.

Tingelhoff was one of 11 players to have played in all four Vikings Super Bowl appearances in the 1970s, and is generally considered to have been the premier center of his era. At the time of his retirement he had started in the 2nd most consecutive games (240 games) in NFL history behind teammate Jim Marshall (270). He was inducted into the Vikings Ring of Honor in 2001 and has had his #53 retired by the franchise.  In 2003, he was named to the Professional Football Researchers Association Hall of Very Good in the association's inaugural HOVG class.

He is also a member of the Nebraska Football Hall of Fame and was elected to the Pro Football Hall of Fame in 2015.

In 2011, Tingelhoff was named as that year's recipient of the Gerald R. Ford Legends Award.  The award was presented to him during the 12th Annual Rimington Trophy Presentation banquet on January 14, 2012, at the Rococo Theatre in Lincoln, Nebraska. He died on September 11, 2021, from complications of Parkinson's disease and dementia.

References

1940 births
2021 deaths
American football centers
Nebraska Cornhuskers football players
Minnesota Vikings players
People from Lexington, Nebraska
Players of American football from Nebraska
Western Conference Pro Bowl players
Pro Football Hall of Fame inductees
National Football League players with retired numbers